Uncut Gems is a soundtrack album by electronic musician Daniel Lopatin, containing the original score for the Safdie brothers' 2019 film Uncut Gems. It was released via Warp on December 13, 2019. It received positive reviews from critics. It peaked at number 44 on the UK Soundtrack Albums Chart.

Background
Film co-director Josh Safdie worked closely with Lopatin on the score, which began with a "Frankenstein" score using library and new-age music before Lopatin began sketching out compositions. Safdie described the soundtrack as "a medicinal new-age soul of a film," in contrast to the "pulse" of their previous collaboration Good Time. Lopatin described it as "more beautiful, ethereal, it's more orchestral, it’s goofier."

The "cosmically synthesized" score uses a Moog One synthesizer, and draws inspiration from artists such as Isao Tomita, Tangerine Dream and Vangelis, as well as the 1970s-80s new-age duo Emerald Web. Lopatin and Safdie used Moog's synthesizer library and Omnisphere to search for "earthy melancholic sounds that had a cosmic twist," as well as saxophone and a choir. The track "Fuck You, Howard" is a reinterpretation of Haydn's Symphony No. 88, while "Windows" is a homage to "Kaneda's theme" from the anime film Akira.

Critical reception

At Metacritic, the album received an average score of 74 out of 100, based on 6 mainstream critical reviews, indicating "generally favorable reviews."

Thomas Johnson of The Line of Best Fit called the album "further proof Lopatin will be held in the same esteem as Ennio Morricone, John Carpenter, Vangelis and so on." He stated that the album is "filled with heartfelt synth lines, gorgeous revolving, spacey sequences and emotive samples" in contrast to his narrower score for Good Time. Ben Beaumont-Thomas of The Guardian wrote that "lesser composers try to merely mirror the action on screen and intensify it, boringly magnifying your emotions." He added, "Lopatin is showing how contradictory, confusing and vital our dumb human impulses are." Mina Tavakoli of Pitchfork stated that the score "has a large blast radius in the movie, itself a funny character in an ensemble of unintentionally funny characters." Matthew Clark of Exclaim! wrote: "Not only does this collection of music have a cinematic quality that lends it its soundtrack purpose, it also stands alone as an engaging set of songs and motifs on their own."

Track listing

Personnel
Credits adapted from liner notes. Some tracks are intercut with dialogue from the film.

 Daniel Lopatin – performance, production
 Conor Abbott Brown – choral production, arrangement
 Maxwell J. McKee – vocals (1, 8, 16), arrangement
 Rob Geldelian – track engineering, edit engineering
 Matt Cohn – engineering, mixing
 Ian Lavely – engineering assistance, mixing assistance
 Jaclyn Sanchez – additional engineering
 Nolan Theis – additional engineering
 Mario Castro – flute (1, 2, 4, 5, 9, 10), saxophone (1, 2, 4, 5, 9, 10)
 Josh Safdie – snake bites (1, 6, 16, 17)
 Emily Schubert – vocals (1, 7, 14)
 Maureen Bailey – vocals (1, 8, 16)
 John Boggs – vocals (1, 8, 16)
 Brian Du Fresne – vocals (1, 8, 16)
 Chelsea Kendall – vocals (1, 8, 16)
 Claire McCahan – vocals (1, 8, 16)
 Rebecca Myers – vocals (1, 8, 16)
 Daniel Parks – vocals (1, 8, 16)
 Eli Keszler – drums (1, 13), percussion (1, 13)
 Adam Sandler – voice (3, 6, 7, 12)
 Ronnie Greenberg – voice (3)
 Marshall Greenberg – voice (3)
 Idina Menzel – voice (6, 7)
 Keren Shemel – voice (6)
 Aren Topian – voice (6)
 Gatekeeper – synthesizer (7, 16)
 Sebastian Bear-McClard – vocals (11, 16)
 Julia Fox – voice (12)
 Kevin Garnett – voice (12)
 Patricia Sullivan Fourstar – mastering
 Caleb Halter – design
 Inez & Vinoodh – cover photography

Charts

References

Further reading

External links
 

2019 soundtrack albums
Crime film soundtracks
Electronic soundtracks
Oneohtrix Point Never albums
Warp (record label) soundtracks
Thriller film soundtracks